The second season of Food Wars!: Shokugeki no Soma anime television series, subtitled , was produced by J.C.Staff under the direction Yoshitomo Yonetani. The story continues Soma Yukihira's journey at the prestigious Totsuki Culinary Academy as he and his classmates compete in the Autumn Elections, followed by their stagiaire (unpaid internships at different restaurants). The series was first broadcast in Japan on MBS from July 2 to September 24, 2016 with additional broadcasts on Tokyo MX, BS11, and Animax.

In the United States, Adult Swim's Toonami programming block aired the English dub from January 19 to April 19, 2020.



Episode list

Home video releases

Japanese

English

Notes

References

External links
  
 

Food Wars!: Shokugeki no Soma episode lists
2016 Japanese television seasons